The deep-bodied pipefish (Leptonotus blainvilleanus)  is a species of marine fish belonging to the family Syngnathidae. They can be found in shallow estuaries and algal beds along the coast of South America from Ecuador to Argentina. Predators of this species include mackerel and the La Plata dolphin. Reproduction occurs through ovoviviparity: the eggs are carried in a pouch under the tail of the male until they hatch.

Size

Etymology
The fish is named in honor of zoologist-anatomist Henri Marie Ducrotay de Blainville (1777-1850)

References

External links 
 Leptonotus blainvilleanus at Fishbase

Leptonotus
Fauna of Temperate South America
Taxa named by Joseph Fortuné Théodore Eydoux
Taxa named by Paul Gervais
Fish described in 1837